Punchi Banda Dissanayake is a Sri Lankan politician and was the 12th Governor of the Central Province (April – December 2018). In 2018 he also served as the acting Governor of  Uva Province. He has previously been the Governor of the North Central Province.

References

Governors of North Central Province, Sri Lanka
Sinhalese politicians
Sri Lankan Buddhists